Regional elections were held in Denmark in December 1900. A total of 435 municipal council members were elected. In addition, 1,817 members of various parish (Danish, sogn) councils (Danish, sogneråd) were selected by the middle class, and 2,535 parish council members by the upper class.

References

1900
Denmark
Elections
December 1900 events